Once and Future King Part II is the fifth studio album released by Gary Hughes.

Track listing 
All songs written by Gary Hughes.
 "Kill the King" – 5:51
 "There by the Grace of the Gods (Go I)" – 5:10
 "I Still Love You (I Still Do)" – 4:06
 "Oceans of Tears" – 4:30
 "Rise from the Shadows" – 3:44
 "Believe Enough to Fight" – 5:02
 "The Hard Way" – 3:46
 "The Pagan Dream" – 5:02
 "Demon Down" – 3:45
 "Deius" (Instrumental) – 1:41
 "Without You" – 6:34
 "Once and Future King" – 6:58

Personnel

Singers-The Cast 

D. C. Cooper – King Aelle (Track 1)
Gary Hughes – King Arthur (Tracks 2 and 3)
Lana Lane – Queen Guinevere (Track 4)
Irene Jansen – Morgana (Track 5)
Bob Catley – Merlin (Track 6)
Sabine Edelsbacher – Nimue (Tracks 6 and 8)
Doogie White – Mordred (Tracks 7 and 9)
Sean Harris – Sir Galahad (Track 11)
Harry Hess – (Track 12)

Musicians-The Players 

Gary Hughes – guitar, piano, keyboards, backing vocals and programming
Chris Francis – guitars
John Halliwell – guitars
Steve McKenna – Bass guitars
Greg Morgan – drums and percussion
Paul Hodson – piano and keyboards (Track 1, 4, 6 and 9)
Graham Woodcock – keyboards (Track 5), backing vocals
Jason Thanos – backing vocals
Damian Wilson – backing vocals
Andy Bramhall – backing vocals
Pete Coleman – backing vocals

Production 
Mixing – Pete Coleman
Engineer – Gary Hughes
Additional Engineering – Pete Coleman, Audu Obaje, Doug Kasper, Erik Norlander, Harry Hess, Billy Churchill and Jason Thanos

External links 
Heavy Harmonies page

2003 albums
Arthurian music
Music based on works
Gary Hughes albums
Albums produced by Gary Hughes
Frontiers Records albums